Witold Stefan Modelski pseud. „Warszawiak” (born 11 November 1932 in Warsaw, died 20 September 1944 therein) – participant of Warsaw Uprising, Liaison officer in „Gozdawa” Battalion, the youngest (not quite 12 years old) participant of uprising fights, awarded with Cross of Valour.

Life story

During the Second World War, after the Modelscy family's house on Nowy Świat Street had burnt out all the family moved themselves onto Leszno Street, where Witold had been maintaining under his mother care until the Warsaw Uprising outbroke. At the beginning of August 1944 Witold joined on „Parasol” Battalion, precisely the 4 pluton of the 1 company. When the Wola had collapsed, Witold Modelski transferred into „The North” Group – „Sosna” section, located on the Warsaw Old Town. Witold Modelski ended his martial fate on Czerniaków in „Parasol” Battalion.

Witold was uncommonly brave. In 23 August 1944 awarded with Cross of Valour and promoted to rank of corporal „during the war”. Fallen in 20 September on the Czerniaków Coast, in home on the Wilanowska Street 1. Buried on Powązki Military Cemetery in Warsaw, in the plot of soldiers and emergency medical technicians from the „Parasol” Battalion.

After the war his mother tracked down Witold's corpse during the soldiers exhumation on the Upper Czerniaków Uprising. Under the cover of night she transported Witold on the Powązki Military Cemetery and buried him near the cemetery wall on her own. Only after several years later his corps was moved into the plot of soldiers and emergency medical technicians from the „Parasol” Battalion. The exact destination of his grave is the quater A24-10-24.

His martial fate was described in books written by Zbigniew Wróblewski, such as Bakwiri z ulicy Leszno and Z jednego domu, where there are numerous substantial mistakes, also including a myth that his family had allegedly fallen already in 1939.

Witold Modelski is the patron of the Little Insurrectionist Hall in Warsaw Uprising Museum.

Notes

References

Externals 
 

1932 births
1944 deaths
Home Army members
Warsaw Uprising insurgents
Recipients of the Cross of Valour (Poland)
People from Warsaw
Burials at Powązki Military Cemetery
Child soldiers in World War II
Polish military personnel killed in World War II